Clute is a Dispersed Rural Community and unincorporated place in the town of Cochrane, in Cochrane District, Ontario, Canada. It is also the name of a geographic township in Cochrane District, at the northeastern corner of which the community lies. An irregularly-shaped eastern part of the geographic township lies in the town of Cochrane following an amalgamation after 1996; the rest, the majority of the township, lies in the Unorganized North Part of Cochrane District.

The community is on Ontario Highway 579. Clute railway station, also in the town of Cochrane but in nearby geographic Blount Township and on the Abitibi River, is served by Ontario Northland Railway Polar Bear Express passenger trains.

References

Other map sources:

Communities in Cochrane District